The Ganjam slender gecko (Hemiphyllodactylus minimus) is a species of gecko. It is endemic to India.

References

Hemiphyllodactylus
Reptiles described in 2020
Endemic fauna of India
Reptiles of India